Nguyễn Diệu Hoa (born 1969 in Hanoi) was crowned the second Miss Vietnam in 1990 when she was at Level 5 in Russian language at Hanoi University of Foreign Studies. She holds an MBA degree from the Asian Institute of Technology (AIT), Thailand. She can speak six languages: Vietnamese, English, Thai, Hindi, Russian, and French. She works at Ceres Commodities Pvt Ltd Company in Thailand. Her husband is Maneesh Dane (Indian), a director of Ceres Commodities Pvt Ltd Company in Asia (the main office is in the United Kingdom). She has three children: two daughters and a son : Nikita, Sonali and Ishan.

Miss Viet Nam 1990 
Winner : Nguyễn Diệu Hoa (Hà Nội)
First runner-up : Trần Vân Anh (Saigon)
Second runner-up : Trần Thu Hằng (Hà Nội)

Mrs World 2008
Mrs. Vietnam Nguyen Dieu Hoa entered the top five contestants of Mrs. World 2008 and finished at fourth runner-up on June 29 at Kalininggrat, Russia. Mrs. Ukraine won the crown.
Best Placements: Mrs World 2008
 Mrs Ukraine: Mrs World 2008
 Mrs Singapore: first runner-up
 Mrs Belarus: second runner-up
 Top 5: Mrs World 2008
 Mrs Peru
 Mrs Vietnam

External links
Miss Vietnam Nguyễn Diệu Hoa

1969 births
Living people
Miss Vietnam winners
People from Hanoi